This is a list of notable German Canadians.

Academics
 Heribert Adam – political sociologist with a focus on ethnonationalism, born in Germany
 Hans Heilbronn – mathematician born in Berlin
 Fritz Heichelheim – German Jewish historian of ancient economics, born in Giessen, Hesse

Scientists
 Gerhard Herzberg – physicist and physical chemist born in Hamburg
 Georg Naumann – trapper, explorer, and self-taught scientist who studied the Athabasca oil sands, born in Radeberg, Saxony

 Bernhard Schlegel – computational and theoretical chemist born in Frankfurt am Main

Artists

 Eric Bergman – artist primarily known for his engraving work, born in Dresden
 Emanuel Hahn – sculptor and coin designer, co-founder and first president of the Sculptors' Society of Canada, brother of Gustav Hahn, born in Reutlingen, Baden-Württemberg
 Ulrich "Fred" Herzog – photographer notable for capturing Vancouver street scenes, born in Stuttgart

Musicians
 Justin Bieber musician, paternal great grandfather was of German ancestry.
 Joe Hall (born Hans Joachim Boenke) – folk rock musician born in Wuppertal
 Tate McRae singer born to a German mother

Painters

 Gustav Hahn – painter, muralist, and interior decorator associated with the Art Nouveau movement, brother of Emanuel Hahn, born in Reutlingen, Baden-Württemberg
 Otto Reinhold Jacobi – painter, president of the Royal Canadian Academy of Arts, born in Königsberg

Businesspeople
 Philip Ludwig "Louis" Breithaupt – tanner and mayor of Berlin, Ontario, born in Allendorf, Hesse
 Friedrich Gaukel – innkeeper, distiller, hotelier born in Württemberg
 Thorsten Heins – businessman and former chief executive officer of BlackBerry, born in Gifhorn, Lower Saxony
 Jacob Hespeler – founder of Hespeler, Ontario, born in Ehningen, Württemberg
 William Hespeler - founder of Niverville, Manitoba
 Stephen A. Jarislowsky – business magnate and investor born in Berlin
 John Adam Rittinger – proprietor and editor of Berliner Journal (1904–1915), Pennsylvania German humorist
Tobias Lütke – founder and CEO of Shopify, born in Koblenz, Rhineland-Palatinate

Politicians
 Hugo Kranz – member of parliament for Waterloo North, mayor of Berlin, Ontario, born at Lehrbach, Hesse
 John Motz – mayor of Berlin, Ontario, 1880–1881. Co-founder of Berliner Journal newspaper.

Sportspeople
 Sven Butenschön – ice hockey player and coach born in Itzehoe
 Sven Habermann – soccer player, former member of the Canada men's national soccer team, born in West Berlin
 Hermann Kerckhoff – slalom canoeist born in Berlin
 Heinz Poenn – slalom canoeist born in Fürth, Bavaria
 Alfred Wurr – wrestler who competed for Canada in the 1972 Summer Olympics, member of the Manitoba Sports Hall of Fame, born in Hamburg

References

Citations

Sources